Jonkor Bourmataguil (also known as Djongor Bourmataguil, Dougne, Karakir) is an Afro-Asiatic language spoken in Chad.

Notes 

East Chadic languages
Languages of Chad